Kumealon Inlet is an inlet on the Coast of British Columbia, Canada. It lies on the eastern side of the north end of Grenville Channel facing Pitt Island.

Kumealon Inlet sits between the Ecstall Pluton and the Grenville Channel shear zone, and is bounded by rocks dating to the Albian (102.6±3.7Ma).

Features
Connected features to the inlet are: 
Kumealon Island, located on the north side of the entrance to the inlet at  
Kumealon Narrows, a short narrows at    
Kumealon Creek, a short creek which feeds northwest into Kumealon Lagoon, entering it at

Images

See also
Inside Passage
Baker Inlet

References

North Coast of British Columbia
Inlets of British Columbia